Rush is a 2012 Indian Hindi-language crime thriller film directed by Shamin Desai and produced by Mohammed Fasih and Shailendra Singh. The film features Emraan Hashmi, Aditya Pancholi, Neha Dhupia and Sagarika Ghatge. The storyline is based on media and crime. The film released on 26 October 2012 on Dussehra. After the death of director Desai, the film was completed by his wife Priyanka Desai. It generally received negative response from critics and was declared a disaster at box-office.

Plot
The story follows media, politics, crime and sex at the point of life and death. Samar Grover (Emraan Hashmi) is a struggling news reporter. Even though his talk show is at the pinnacle of success, his personal life has turned upside down due to problems with his wife (Sagarika Ghatge). Seeing no way out, he accepts an assignment offered by a dynamic media tycoon named Lisa (Neha Dhupia), which he believes can make him millions. However, along with Lisa, one of India's most richest man, Roger Khanna (Aditya Pancholi), together play a game on Samar, which plunges him into a vortex of violence in a deadly game of cat and mouse. Beneath the veneer of glamour, money, power and the enviable life of media, lays a truth that is at once unbelievable and shocking.

Cast
 Emraan Hashmi as Samar Grover
 Younas UD as Younas UD
 Neha Dhupia as Lisa Kapoor
 Sagarika Ghatge as Ahana Sharma
 Aditya Pancholi as Roger Khanna
 Murli Sharma
 Rahul Singh as Kudo
 Ashok Banthia as Raja Choudhary
 Sharmin Tithi(Bagmara)
 Zuyel Rana(Natore)

Production
The film was announced in late 2010 by original director Desai. After casting Emraan Hashmi and Sagarika Ghatge, it started filming under the title of Raftaar 24x7. However, after the death of director Desai in January 2011, the film was reported to be cancelled. In October 2011, Desai's wife Priyanka announced that she will be completing the film, and it was renamed to Play. In mid-2012, it was finally announced that the film has been completed, and will be titled Rush.

Soundtrack

The soundtrack is composed by Pritam. It consists of 6 songs and lyrics penned by Sayeed Quadri, Kumaar, Ashish Pandit and Hard Kaur.

Reception
The soundtrack received positive to average reviews from critics as well as public.

Happysing.com gave a very positive review saying, "Rush has some really good songs, chhup chhup ke and Mumkin Nahi are must listen. Rest aren’t bad too. Worth a try for all, and worth a buy if you’re a music lover."
Suhail of  Gomolo gave the soundtrack 4 out of 5 stars justifying the soundtrack as 'An Everlasting Package' with tracks that are too hard to drop-out. Rush soundtrack is a Highly outrageous travel!.

There were average reviews as well. One of them was given by Music Aloud who gave the album an average rating of "5.5 out of 10 stars" and commented, "After a superlative effort in Barfi, surprisingly unremarkable score from Pritam for Rush".

One of the negative review was given by Bollyspice.com who gave the album a negative rating of "2 out of 5 stars" and also commented that, "I found the soundtrack to Rush to be a frail attempt on Pritam’s part. After having recently composed some truly spectacular songs for his last album ‘Barfi!,’ Pritam has delivered here an album which has two great songs with the rest being very average."

Release
Rush was to be initially released on 26 October but for some reasons it was then pre-poned to 24 October. However the film was again postponed from 24 to 26 October due to lot of films being released around the same time and the emergence of successful run of Karan Johar's Student of the Year. The film was finally released on 26 October 2012. Rush released in 850 cinemas across the entire country.

Critical reception

Rush received mostly negative to below average reviews.
Apurv Bhatia of Koimoi gave it 1.5 stars "Rush is a half baked, uninspiring flick that evokes no response." wrote Apurv. Social Movie Rating site gave it a rating of 2.4 putting it in Below Average category. Taran Adarsh of Bollywood Hungama gave it 2 stars. Rohit Khilnani of Rediff gave it 1.5 stars.

References

External links
 
Rush on Bollywood Hungama

2012 films
2010s Hindi-language films
Films shot in India
Indian crime thriller films
Films featuring songs by Pritam
2012 crime thriller films